Proulx is a surname. Notable people with the surname include:

Amédée Wilfrid Proulx, American Catholic Bishop
Annie Proulx, American journalist and author
Brooklynn Proulx, Canadian actress
Christian Proulx, retired Canadian hockey player
Danielle Proulx, an actress
Matthieu Proulx, Canadian football player
Monique Proulx, Canadian novelist, short story writer and screenwriter
Monique Proulx, Canadian racing driver
John Proulx, jazz pianist, vocalist and composer
Richard Proulx, composer and organist
Shaun Proulx writer, radio / television personality and speaker
Sébastien Proulx, Canadian politician
Stéphane Proulx, Canadian racing driver